Fired On is a 1907 oil painting by Frederic Remington.  It measures  and has been held by the Smithsonian American Art Museum since 1910.  

Sometimes described as a nocturne, it depicts a group of men on horseback lit by moonlight in the murky pre-dawn.  An unseen adversary has fired upon the man on a white horse.  

The painting was bought by William T. Evans in November 1909, and he donated it to the Smithsonian Gallery of Art, now the Smithsonian American Art Museum.  It was the first painting by Remington to be acquired by a US public gallery.  The painting was displayed in the Oval Office during the presidency of Harry S. Truman.  Later presidents preferred bronzes by Remington, such as The Bronco Buster or The Rattlesnake.

Remington's paintings of the Wild West were later copied by Western filmmakers, with John Ford saying that his 1948 movie She Wore a Yellow Ribbon: "I tried to copy the Remington style there.  You can't copy him one hundred per cent, but you can get the colour and the movement."

See also
 Art in the White House

References
 Fired On, Smithsonian American Art Museum
 Fired On, Google Arts & Culture
 Still in the Saddle: The Hollywood Western, 1969–1980, Andrew Patrick Nelson, p.147
 Frederic Remington: A Catalogue Raisonné II, edited by Peter H. Hassrick, p.146

1907 paintings
Horses in art
Art in the White House
Paintings by Frederic Remington
Paintings in the collection of the Smithsonian American Art Museum